Mario Pisu (21 May 1910 – 17 July 1976) was an Italian actor and voice actor.

Biography
Born in Montecchio Emilia, Pisu was considered to be one of the most elegant performers of the Italian cinema. He began his career on stage and screen in 1935, making his debut appearance in The Joker King and also making frequent on-stage collaborations with Andreina Pagnani, Evi Maltagliati, Rina Morelli, Paolo Stoppa and Gino Cervi. Pisu appeared in 90 films between 1935 and 1976 and among his most popular appearances includes the 1965 film Juliet of the Spirits starring Giulietta Masina. He also appeared on television.

Pisu was also a popular voice actor and dubber. With a very modulated voice, he dubbed actors such as Gregory Peck, John Wayne, Ward Bond, Walter Pidgeon, Lee J. Cobb, Robert Mitchum, Victor Mature, Fred MacMurray, Kenneth Tobey and many more. In Pisu's animated roles, he voiced Captain in the Italian dub of the 1961 animated film One Hundred and One Dalmatians.

Pisu died from a cerebral hemorrhage on 17 July 1976, at the age of 66.

Selected filmography

 Red Passport (1935) - Gianni Casati
 The Joker King (1936) - Captain Rodriguez
 King of Diamonds (1936) - Franco
 White Amazons (1936) - Biancheri
 The Carnival Is Here Again (1937) - Fausto, il pittore
 Il suo destino (1938) - Andrea, l'ingegnere
 La sposa dei Re (1938) - Il conte Giovanbattista Bernadotte
 Crispino e la comare (1938) - Il giovane pittore
 L'aria del continente (1939)
 The Last Enemy (1940) - Ferdinando De Medio
 Manovre d'amore (1940) - Il tenente medico Skafos
 Princess Cinderella (1941) - Il bellissimo Cecè
 We the Living (1942) - Viktor Dunaev
 Addio Kira! (1942) - Victor Dunaev
 Il nostro prossimo (1943) - Don Luigi
 The Innkeeper (1944) - Fabrizio
 Lettere al sottotenente (1945)
 Romulus and the Sabines (1945) - Alberto Randoni
 Il canto della vita (1945) - Rimondino
 Il marito povero (1946)
 Professor, My Son (1946) - Ettore Giraldi
 Biraghin (1946)
 Margaret of Cortona (1950) - Rinaldo Degli Uberti
 The Merry Widower (1950) - Rinaldo Degli Uberti
 Bluebeard's Six Wives (1950) - Sergio
 The Devil in the Convent (1950) - Padre Claudio
 I'm the Capataz (1951) - Hurtado
 The Reluctant Magician (1951)
 Anna (1951)
 Gli uomini non guardano il cielo (1952)
 Five Paupers in an Automobile (1952) - Il direttore del salone auto
 The Temptress (1952)
 Jealousy (1953) - Barone Antonio (voice, uncredited)
 Dieci canzoni d'amore da salvare (1953) - Delle Piane
 Di qua, di là del Piave (1954)
 Toto in Hell (1955) - Tolomeo
 Poveri ma belli (1957) - Amico del padre di Giovanna (voice, uncredited)
 Hercules (1958)
 First Love (1959) - Paolo
 Hannibal (1959)
 The Cossacks (1960) - Prince Voronzov
 Mariti a congresso (1961)
 Roaring Years (1962) - Peppino (uncredited)
 The Slave (1962) - Goular (voice, uncredited)
 Lo smemorato di Collegno (1962) - Avvocato Dell'Orso
 I motorizzati (1962) - Angelo
 Sexy Toto (1963) - L'impresario (businessman)
 8½ (1963) - Mario Mezzabotta
 Zorro and the Three Musketeers (1963) - Count of Tequel
 The Organizer (1963) - Manager
 I diavoli di Spartivento (1963)
 Soldati e caporali (1965) - Colonnello Rigamonti
 La violenza e l'amore (1965)
 Juliet of the Spirits (1965) - Giorgio (Giulietta's husband)
 Gendarme in New York (1965) - L'adjudant Renzo
 I soldi (1965)
 Made in Italy (1965) - The Lawyer (segment "2 'Il Lavoro', episode 2")
 Te lo leggo negli occhi (1965) - Dino's Father
 Lo scippo (1965) - comm. Frascà
 Me, Me, Me... and the Others (1966) - Winner of the 'Capranica'
 How We Robbed the Bank of Italy (1966) - Paolo
 Adultery Italian Style (1966) - Il vicino
 I nostri mariti (1966) - The Andrologist (segment "Il marito di Olga")
 Atout cœur à Tokyo pour OSS 117 (1966) - Vargas
 Pardon, Are You For or Against? (1966) - Barone Renato Santambrogio
 The Looters (1967) - Patrick O'Hara
 Johnny Banco (1967) - (uncredited)
 Spia spione (1967)
 Morire gratis (1968) - Giovanni
 Emma Hamilton (1968) - Le roi Ferdinand de Naples
 L'amore è come il sole (1969)
 Temptation (1969)
 Zingara (1969) - Marisa and Silvia's father
 In Prison Awaiting Trial (1971) - Psichiatra
 We Are All in Temporary Liberty (1971)
 Il Boss (1973) - Onorevole Gabrielli
 Sans sommation (1973) - (uncredited)
 Io e lui (1973) - Protti
 The Sensual Man (1973) - Lorenzo Banchieri
 Ordine firmato in bianco (1974) - Attorney General
 Carnalità (1974) - Count Orsani
 Conviene far bene l'amore (1975) - Minister
 L'Infermiera (1975) - Leonida Bottacin
 Il giustiziere di mezzogiorno (1975) - Capo della Polizia
 Blue Jeans (1975) - Mario / Lawyer
 Nick the Sting (1976) - Phil
 Sorbole... che romagnola (1976) - The Vicar

References

External links

1910 births
1976 deaths
Italian male film actors
Italian male voice actors
Italian male stage actors
Italian male television actors
People from Reggio Emilia
20th-century Italian male actors